César Alexander Doy Tello (born 7 April 1982) is a Peruvian footballer who plays as a defender for José Gálvez FBC.

Club career
César Doy made his debut in the Torneo Descentralizado in the 2000 season playing for Deportivo Wanka, under manager Roberto Mosquera. 

Then in January 2003 he joined Coronel Bolognesi. Then the following season with Bolognesi he made his debut in the Copa Sudamericana. 

In January 2005 Doy had his first spell with FBC Melgar.

References

1982 births
Living people
Footballers from Lima
Peruvian footballers
Club Deportivo Wanka footballers
Coronel Bolognesi footballers
FBC Melgar footballers
Sport Boys footballers
Unión Huaral footballers
Alianza Atlético footballers
Sport Huancayo footballers
José Gálvez FBC footballers
Peruvian Primera División players
Association football fullbacks